Sadako and the Thousand Paper Cranes is an album by pianist George Winston with narration by actress Liv Ullmann, released in 1995. Winston's guitar solos also appear apart from the narration, which follows the true story of Sadako Sasaki, a victim of Hiroshima bombing. Suffering from radiation-induced leukemia, Sadako spent her time in a hospital folding origami paper cranes hoping to make a thousand of them and thereby receiving a wish, one she would use to heal and live.

Track listing 
All songs by George Winston unless otherwise noted.

Narration with solo guitar
 "Introduction/Transformation/Early One Morning/Running/Peace Park" – 3:51
 "Bells/Birds in Flight/Grandmother's Lament" – 1:39
 "The Race/Sadako's Lament/A New Year's Lullaby/Sadako's Lament II" (John Creger, Winston) – 5:28
 "A Good Luck Sign/The Magic of the Cranes/Folding Cranes" – 3:46
 "Meeting Kenji/Mon Enfant/Kenji's Lament/Star Island" – 4:27
 "Going Home/A Silk Kimono/Sadako's Lament III" – 6:02
 "This Is Our Cry/Epilogue" – 5:05

Solo guitar music only
 "Introduction/Transformation" – 46
 "Early One Morning (Sadako's Slack Key #1)" – 1:35
 "Running/Peace Park" –  :54
 "Bells" – :18
 "Birds in Flight" (Traditional) – 2:07
 "Grandmother's Lament" – 48
 "The Race/Sadako's Lament" – 1:52
 "A New Year's Lullaby" (John Creger) –  :59
 "Sadako's Lament II" – 1:24
 "A Good Luck Sign" –  :49
 "The Magic of the Cranes" – :53
 "Folding Cranes" – 1:07
 "Meeting Kenji" – 2:14
 "Mon Enfant/Kenji's Lament/Star Island" (Traditional, Winston) – 3:11
 "Going Home" – 1:22
 "A Silk Kimono" – 1:16
 "Sadako's Lament III" – 2:07
 "This Is Our Cry" – 1:47
 "Epilogue (Sadako's Slack Key #2)" – 2:41

Personnel
George Winston – piano, guitar
Liv Ullmann – narration

See also
 Sadako and the Thousand Paper Cranes

References

External links
Liner Notes

1995 soundtrack albums
George Winston albums
Windham Hill Records albums
1990s film soundtrack albums